The Richard Sanger III House is a historic house in Sherborn, Massachusetts.  It is a -story timber-frame house, five bays wide, with a side gambrel roof and clapboard siding.  The windows of the front facade are symmetrically placed, but the door is slightly off-center, flanked by sidelight windows and topped by a gabled pediment.  The house was built c. 1734, with a rear leanto added around 1775.  It is unusual in the town as an 18th-century gambrel-roofed house with leanto.  Sanger was the son of a Boston merchant, and one of the few people on the town documented to own slaves.

The house was listed on the National Register of Historic Places in 1986.

See also
National Register of Historic Places listings in Sherborn, Massachusetts

References

Houses on the National Register of Historic Places in Middlesex County, Massachusetts
Houses in Sherborn, Massachusetts
Georgian architecture in Massachusetts